Oliwia Zalewska  Czuprynska (born 20 January 1995) is a Polish professional pool player. Zalewska is a former WPA World Nine-ball junior champion, winning the ladies event in 2011. She also reached the final the following year, losing in the final to Diana Khodjaeva. She is also a three-time winner of Euro Tour events, winning the 2015 Treviso Open, 2019 Antalya Open and 2019 Klagenfurt Open. In addition, she has reached four finals, and won a total of seven medals at events on the tour.

Achievements
 Euro Tour
 2015 Treviso Open
 2019 Antalya Open
 2019 Klagenfurt Open
 2021 Antalya Open
 2023 Estonian Open 
 2011 WPA World Nine-ball Junior Championship

References

External links

1995 births
Living people
Female pool players
Polish pool players
Polish sportswomen
20th-century Polish women
21st-century Polish women
Competitors at the 2022 World Games